The Peruvian Humanist Party (PHP), formerly the (Peruvian Humanist Movement Party) is a humanist political party in Peru, and a former member of the Decentralization Coalition together with the Partido por la Democracia Social - Compromiso Perú. The PMHP won the regional elections of 2002 for the northern region of Lambayeque.

In 2008, Yehude Simon of PMHP became Prime Minister of Peru under Alan García. He resigned less than a year later.

For the 2011 Peruvian general election the party was allied with the Alliance for the Great Change of Pedro Pablo Kuczynski, that won 12 seats in Congress, making Yehude Simon a congressman for Lambayeque Region.

Since 2017, the party is currently a member of the Together for Peru coalition, although its party registration was used in order to formalize the union by changing the party's name to the coalition's name. The coalition is composed by the Peruvian Communist Party, the Decentralist Social Force Party, the Communist Party of Peru – Red Fatherland, Citizens for Change, Únete por otra Democracia, and Movement Towards Socialism. At the legislative elections held on 26 January 2020, the Humanist Party, which was part of the Together for Peru coalition won 4.8% of the popular vote but no seats in the Congress of the Republic. Although, the first projections gave the coalition approximately 5.0% within the margin of error, the party failed to get past the electoral threshold in order to attain representation.

Electoral history

Presidential election

Election to the Congress of the Republic

References

External links
 Official website (Spanish)

2001 establishments in Peru
Democratic socialist parties in South America
Humanist Party
Political parties established in 2001
Political parties in Peru
Socialist parties in Peru